Jewish press may refer to:
The Jewish Press
Jewish newspapers in general
Antisemitic canard than Jews control the press coverage in general